Fox is a Dutch free-to-cable television channel operated by Eredivisie Media & Marketing CV in which The Walt Disney Company (Benelux) BV has 51% ownership. Fox was already in the Netherlands between 1998 and 2001 that was rebranded by Veronica. The current channel launched on 19 August 2013. The channel has a line-up consisting of television series, sporting events and films.

History
On 19 August 2013, the Fox channel was revived by Eredivisie Media & Marketing CV, in which Fox Networks Group Benelux (part of 21st Century Fox) holds 51%. Again series and films are being broadcast. But also Sports. The channel is a basic subscription channel that promoted the premium TV stations of Fox Sports Eredivisie. The channel name is written entirely by capital letters, as FOX. Sports highlights were broadcast on the channel. There was also a talk show on Friday (Fox Football), presented by Toine van Peperstraten with exclusive analyzes by Jan van Halst. Wessel van Diepen was the voice-over of the station at that time.

In August 2015 Fox lost the broadcasting rights of the Johan Cruyff Shield and the KNVB Cup, which meant that the channel would only broadcast films and series for three years. From August 2018, the broadcasting rights of the Johan Cruyff Shield and the KNVB Cup returned to Fox. Fox also received the broadcasting rights of the Eerste Divisie. Since 17 August 2018, Fox broadcasts sports programs from Fox Sports every Monday and Friday between 6 PM and 2 AM with switches between matches and summaries on Friday and one live match and summaries on Monday of the Eerste Divisie (the sports programming will only take place if there are actual live matches). Fox is a channel with an emphasis on entertainment and sports.

On 20 March 2019 The Walt Disney Company acquired 21st Century Fox, including Fox Networks Group Benelux.

Programming 
 'Til Death
 11.22.63
 1864
 American Horror Story
 Ascension
 Atlanta
 A.D. The Bible Continues
 Bojack Horseman
 Bones
 Boomtown
 Chicago Fire
 Chicago PD
 Colony
 Cordon
 Da Vinci's Demons
 Empire
 Episodes
 The Flash
 Garage Gold
 The Goldbergs
 The Heavy Water War
 House
 Law & Order: Criminal Intent
 The Mentalist
 The Middle
 Mike & Molly
 Minority Report
 Outcast
 Outsiders
 Prison Break
 Paranormal Caught on Camera
 Quantico
 Raising Hope
 Rosewood
 Salem
 Scream Queens
 Second Chance
 Shades of Blue
 Shark Tank
 The Simpsons
 Sleepy Hollow
 Sons of Liberty
 Storage Wars
 The Strain
 The Team
 Ultimate Airport Dubai
 Vermist
 Vikings
 The Walking Dead
 Wallander
 Wayward Pines
 Will & Grace
 The X-Files

References

Television channels in the Netherlands
Television channels and stations established in 2013
Dutch